Tunnel Blanket is the third studio album by the American band This Will Destroy You. Recorded and mixed by John Congleton, it was released in Europe on May 9, 2011, on Monotreme Records, and on May 10 on Suicide Squeeze Records for the rest of the world with the exception of Australia and New Zealand where it was released by Hobbledehoy Record Co.

Tunnel Blanket consists of drone style music, with the band's members describing it as 'doomgaze', a cross between doom metal and shoegazing. The album is described as dark, with a theme of death.

This is the first album to feature bassist/keyboardist Donovan Jones and drummer Alex Bhore.

Track listing

Source:

Personnel
This Will Destroy You
 Jeremy Galindo - guitar
 Donovan Jones - bass guitar, keyboard
 Chris King - guitar
 Alex Bhore - drums

 Additional musicians
Christopher Tignor - strings
Michael Bryant - brass

Production
John Congleton - mixing, engineering
Alan Douches - mastering

References 

2011 albums
This Will Destroy You albums
Albums produced by John Congleton
Suicide Squeeze Records albums